Madan Bauri may refer to:

 Madan Bauri (minister) ( 1936–2015), Indian politician
 Madan Bauri (MLA), Indian politician